Great Debate may refer to

 The Great Debate, also called the Samye Debate, the Council of Lhasa or the Council of Samye, a decisive debate in Tibetan Buddhism from 792 to 794
 The Great Debates of 1858, the Lincoln–Douglas debates
 Great Debates (international relations),  a series of disagreements between international relations scholars
 The Great Debate, a national discussion in the United Kingdom about state education, touched off by a 1976 speech by Prime Minister James Callaghan
 Great Debate (Cuba), a debate in Cuba about how to transform the economy from 1962-1965.

Science
 Great Debate (astronomy), an influential debate between the astronomers Harlow Shapley and Heber Curtis
 The Great Debate, an influential debate on the future of radiation oncology between leading Dutch professors in medical physics (2013)

Media
 The Great Debate (Canadian TV series), a Canadian television series (1974–1983)
 "The Great Debate", a song by Dream Theater from their 2002 album Six Degrees of Inner Turbulence
The Great Debate (American TV series), a VH1 program (2009–present)
The Great Debate (British TV series), a Sky News programme (2022–present)

Literature
 The Great Debate: Edmund Burke, Thomas Paine, and the Birth of Right and Left, a 2014 book by Yuval Levin